Limnonectes microtympanum (common name: Sulawesi wart frog) is a species of frog in the family Dicroglossidae. It is endemic to Sulawesi, Indonesia, where it is only known from the Moncong Lompobatang mountain at elevations above .

Limnonectes microtympanum is a common frog within its restricted range. It lives in and around streams in montane forests.

References

Microtympanum
Endemic fauna of Indonesia
Amphibians of Sulawesi
Taxonomy articles created by Polbot
Amphibians described in 1907